The 2018 UEFA European Under-17 Championship qualifying competition was a men's under-17 football competition that determined the 15 teams joining the automatically qualified hosts England in the 2018 UEFA European Under-17 Championship final tournament.

Apart from England, all remaining 54 UEFA member national teams entered the qualifying competition (including Kosovo who entered for the first time). Players born on or after 1 January 2001 are eligible to participate. Each match has a duration of 80 minutes, consisting of two halves of 40 minutes with a 15-minute half-time.

Format
The qualifying competition consists of two rounds:
Qualifying round: Apart from Germany and Portugal, which receive byes to the elite round as the teams with the highest seeding coefficient, the remaining 52 teams are drawn into 13 groups of four teams. Each group is played in single round-robin format at one of the teams selected as hosts after the draw. The 13 group winners, the 13 runners-up, and the four third-placed teams with the best record against the first and second-placed teams in their group advance to the elite round.
Elite round: The 32 teams are drawn into eight groups of four teams. Each group is played in single round-robin format at one of the teams selected as hosts after the draw. The eight group winners and the seven runners-up with the best record against the first and third-placed teams in their group qualify for the final tournament.

The schedule of each mini-tournament is as follows (Regulations Article 20.04):

Tiebreakers
In the qualifying round and elite round, teams are ranked according to points (3 points for a win, 1 point for a draw, 0 points for a loss), and if tied on points, the following tiebreaking criteria are applied, in the order given, to determine the rankings (Regulations Articles 14.01 and 14.02):
Points in head-to-head matches among tied teams;
Goal difference in head-to-head matches among tied teams;
Goals scored in head-to-head matches among tied teams;
If more than two teams are tied, and after applying all head-to-head criteria above, a subset of teams are still tied, all head-to-head criteria above are reapplied exclusively to this subset of teams;
Goal difference in all group matches;
Goals scored in all group matches;
Penalty shoot-out if only two teams have the same number of points, and they met in the last round of the group and are tied after applying all criteria above (not used if more than two teams have the same number of points, or if their rankings are not relevant for qualification for the next stage);
Disciplinary points (red card = 3 points, yellow card = 1 point, expulsion for two yellow cards in one match = 3 points);
UEFA coefficient for the qualifying round draw;
Drawing of lots.

To determine the four best third-placed teams from the qualifying round and the seven best runners-up from the elite round, the results against the teams in fourth place are discarded. The following criteria are applied (Regulations Articles 15.01, 15.02 and 15.03):
Points;
Goal difference;
Goals scored;
Disciplinary points;
UEFA coefficient for the qualifying round draw;
Drawing of lots.

Qualifying round

Draw
The draw for the qualifying round was held on 13 December 2016, 09:00 CET (UTC+1), at the UEFA headquarters in Nyon, Switzerland.

The teams were seeded according to their coefficient ranking, calculated based on the following:
2014 UEFA European Under-17 Championship final tournament and qualifying competition (qualifying round and elite round)
2015 UEFA European Under-17 Championship final tournament and qualifying competition (qualifying round and elite round)
2016 UEFA European Under-17 Championship final tournament and qualifying competition (qualifying round and elite round)

Each group contained one team from Pot A, one team from Pot B, one team from Pot C, and one team from Pot D. For political reasons, Russia and Ukraine, Spain and Gibraltar, Serbia and Kosovo, and Bosnia and Herzegovina and Kosovo would not be drawn in the same group.

Notes
Teams marked in bold have qualified for the final tournament.

Groups
The qualifying round must be played by 19 November 2017.

Times up to 28 October 2017 are CEST (UTC+2), thereafter times are CET (UTC+1).

Group 1

Group 2

Group 3

Group 4

Group 5

Group 6

Group 7

Group 8

Group 9

Group 10

Group 11

Group 12

Group 13

Ranking of third-placed teams
To determine the four best third-placed teams from the qualifying round which advance to the elite round, only the results of the third-placed teams against the first and second-placed teams in their group are taken into account.

Elite round

Draw
The draw for the elite round was held on 6 December 2017, 11:45 CET (UTC+1), at the UEFA headquarters in Nyon, Switzerland.

The teams were seeded according to their results in the qualifying round. Germany and Portugal, which received byes to the elite round, were automatically seeded into Pot A. Each group contained one team from Pot A, one team from Pot B, one team from Pot C, and one team from Pot D. Winners and runners-up from the same qualifying round group could not be drawn in the same group, but the best third-placed teams could be drawn in the same group as winners or runners-up from the same qualifying round group.

Groups
The elite round must be played by the end of March 2018.

Times up to 24 March 2018 are CET (UTC+1), thereafter times are CEST (UTC+2).

Group 1

The Serbia v Ukraine match was completed with a score of 1–2 before a default victory was awarded to Serbia due to participation of disqualified Ukrainian players Mykola Yarosh and Roman Bodnia.

Group 2

Group 3

Group 4

Group 5

Group 6

Group 7

Group 8

Ranking of second-placed teams
To determine the seven best second-placed teams from the elite round which qualify for the final tournament, only the results of the second-placed teams against the first and third-placed teams in their group are taken into account.

Qualified teams
The following 16 teams qualified for the final tournament.

1 Bold indicates champions for that year. Italic indicates hosts for that year.
2 As Yugoslavia
3 As Serbia and Montenegro

Goalscorers
8 goals

 Adam Idah

7 goals

 Zuriko Davitashvili
 Daishawn Redan
 Kornelius Norman Hansen

6 goals

 Mohamed Lamine Diaby
 Oscar Aga

4 goals

 Ajdin Hasić
 Panagiotis Tzimas
 Kristóf Tóth-Gábor
 Milutin Vidosavljević
 Nabil Touaizi
 Benjamin Nygren
 Danylo Sikan

3 goals

 Kleis Bozhanaj
 Marcel Monsberger
 Maksim Kapraliou
 Antonio Marin
 Mario Vušković
 Daniil Paroutis
 Terry Ablade
 Maximo Tolonen
 Lucas Da Cunha
 Khvicha Kvaratskhelia
 Andri Guðjohnsen
 Ibrahim Jauabra
 Ofek Ovadia
 Jakub Karbownik
 Sean Brennan
 Martin Novaković
 Nik Prelec
 Tamar Svetlin
 Julian Larsson
 Uros Vasic
 Julian Vonmoos
 Mykhailo Mudryk

2 goals

 Turan Valizada
 Gabriel Lemoine
 Lucas Lissens
 Yorbe Vertessen
 Denil Badžak
 Tomislav Krizmanić
 Matyáš Kozák
 Gustav Tang Isaksen
 Elias Mastokangas
 Yanis Begraoui
 Noah Katterbach
 Konstantinos Thymianis
 Georgios Vrakas
 Péter Beke
 Stefan Ingi Sigurdarson
 Liel Abada
 Nicolò Fagioli
 Davide Ghislandi
 Bartosz Bida
 Paweł Żuk
 Tyreik Samuel Wright
 Marian Dumitru Alexandru
 Billy Gilmour
 Marc Leonard
 Dragoljub Savić
 Peter Pokorny
 Sergio Camello
 Tician Tushi
 Mustafa Kaya
 Vikentii Voloshyn

1 goal

 Emiliano Bullari
 Astrit Rama
 Alex Alonso Guerrero
 Amir Abdijanovic
 Martin Moormann
 Lukas Schöfl
 Ismayil Zulfugarli
 Dzianis Milasheuski
 Antoine Colassin
 Lars Dendoncker
 Largie Ramazani
 Laurens Symons
 Halim Timassi
 Alen Mehić
 Edin Mujić
 Kristijan Stanić
 Vladimir Nikolov
 Ivan Brnić
 Ivan Šarić
 Michalis Constantinidis
 Charis Kapsos
 Rafail Mamas
 Dimitris Raspas
 Agapios Vrikkis
 David Eichler
 Filip Firbacher
 Šimon Gabriel
 Jan Holzer
 Ladislav Krobot
 Andreas Pyndt Andersen
 Muamer Brajanac
 Oliver Marc Rose-Villadsen
 Yann Gboho
 Loïc Mbe Soh
 Antonis Aidonis
 Oliver Batista Meier
 Ole Pohlmann
 Ioannis Fakkis
 Pavlos Mavroudis
 Dominik Cipf
 Tibor Csala
 Benedek Varju
 Hanan Hen Biton
 Osher Davida
 Omri Ram
 Lorenzo Colombo
 Fabio Ponsi
 Alessio Riccardi
 Samuele Ricci
 Edoardo Vergani
 Stanislav Basmanov
 Florian Hysenaj
 Albin Prapashtica
 Renārs Varslavāns
 Ernestas Andriušis
 Lukas Juodkūnaitis
 Vilius Piliukaitis
 Clayton Duarte
 Tun Held
 Vlada Novevski
 Vane Tasevski
 David Toshevski
 Alexander Satariano
 Nikša Vujanović
 Mohammed Ihattaren
 Enric Llansana
 Nigel Thomas
 Arjen van der Heide
 Joshua Zirkzee
 Ben Wilson
 Kristoffer Askildsen
 Josef Brian Baccay
 Sander Johan Christiansen
 Noah Jean Holm
 Joshua Gaston Kitolano
 Szymon Czyż
 Michał Karbownik
 Olaf Kobacki
 Maik Nawrocki
 Mikołaj Nawrocki
 Patryk Richert
 Mateusz Żukowski
 Félix Correia
 Nuno Costa
 Eduardo Ribeiro
 Francisco Saldanha
 Barry Coffey
 Max Murphy
 Adam O'Reilly
 Troy Parrott
 Luis Emanuel Nitu
 Antonio Vlad
 Leonid Gerchikov
 Maksim Kutovoy
 Maksim Petrov
 Adedapo Awokoya-Mebude
 Dean Campbell
 Jamie Semple
 Kristijan Belić
 Borisav Burmaz
 Ivan Ilić
 Bogdan Jočić
 Lazar Pavlović
 Danilo Mitrović
 Luka Velikić
 Ján Bernát
 Oliver Burian
 Patrik Iľko
 Samuel Lavrinčík
 Dávid Strelec
 Matija Burin
 Renato Simič
 Jošt Urbančič
 Roberto González
 Miguel Gutiérrez
 Víctor Mollejo
 Helmer Andersson
 Fredrik Hammar
 Jack Lahne
 Amel Mujanic
 Rasmus Wikström
 Felix Mambimbi
 Ilan Sauter
 Simon Sohm
 Ruwen Werthmüller
 Christian Witzig
 Barışcan Işık Altunbaş
 Serkan Bakan
 Abdulkadir Çelik
 Fırat Güllü
 Atakan Gündüz
 Süleyman Luş
 Alan Aussi
 Stanislav Biblyk
 Artem Shulianskyi
 Roman Yakuba
 Isaak Davies
 Joshua Hosie
 Callum Watts

1 own goal

 Arman Ghazaryan (against Czech Republic)
 Uladzislau Belashevich (against France)
 Noah Nurmi (against Portugal)
 Elguja Jangveladze (against Republic of Ireland)
 Kristóf Vida (against Israel)
 Kristijan Trpčevski (against Georgia)
 Maksim Kutovoy (against Faroe Islands)
 Andrea Contadini (against Poland)
 Keenan Pattern (against The Netherlands)

Notes

References

External links

Qualification
2018
2017 in youth association football
2018 in youth association football
September 2017 sports events in Europe
October 2017 sports events in Europe
November 2017 sports events in Europe
March 2018 sports events in Europe